Bihastina subviridata is a moth in the family Geometridae first described by George Thomas Bethune-Baker in 1915. It is found in Papua New Guinea.

References

Moths described in 1915
Asthenini
Moths of New Guinea